The 1970 Atlantic Coast Conference men's basketball tournament was held in Charlotte, North Carolina, at the original Charlotte Coliseum from March 5–7, 1970.   defeated South Carolina, 42–39, in double overtime to win the championship. Vann Williford of NC State was named tournament MVP.

Bracket

References

Tournament
ACC men's basketball tournament
College sports in North Carolina
Basketball competitions in Charlotte, North Carolina
ACC men's basketball tournament
ACC men's basketball tournament